The 1988 season was São Paulo's 59th season since club's existence.

Statistics

Scorers

Managers performance

Overall

{|class="wikitable"
|-
|Games played || 51 (25 Campeonato Paulista, 23 Campeonato Brasileiro, 3 Friendly match)
|-
|Games won || 24 (13 Campeonato Paulista, 9 Campeonato Brasileiro, 2 Friendly match)
|-
|Games drawn || 15 (6 Campeonato Paulista, 8 Campeonato Brasileiro, 1 Friendly match)
|-
|Games lost || 12 (6 Campeonato Paulista, 6 Campeonato Brasileiro, 0 Friendly match)
|-
|Goals scored || 72
|-
|Goals conceded || 46
|-
|Goal difference || +26
|-
|Best result || 5–0 (H) v América - Campeonato Paulista - 1988.03.09
|-
|Worst result || 0–3 (H) v Guarani - Campeonato Paulista - 1988.03.230–3 (H) v Santos - Campeonato Paulista - 1988.05.220–3 (A) v Grêmio - Campeonato Brasileiro - 1988.09.07
|-
|Top scorer || Müller (17)
|-

Friendlies

Official competitions

Campeonato Paulista

Record

Campeonato Brasileiro

Record

External links
official website 

Sao Paulo
São Paulo FC seasons